Territorial Assembly elections were held in Niger on 14 December 1958. The result was a victory for the Union for the Franco-African Community  (an alliance of the Nigerien Progressive Party – African Democratic Rally and the African Regroupment Party), which won 49 of the 60 seats.

On 18 December 1958, the Territorial Assembly convened and proclaimed itself a Constituent Assembly.

Results

Aftermath
Following the elections, the results in the Tessaoua and Zinder constituencies, where Sawaba had won all their seats, were annulled due to irregularities. The Tessaoua seats were awarded to the UCFA, whilst a by-election was scheduled for Zinder on 27 June 1959. Ballot papers were only printed for the PPN-RDA, and due to fears of violence, Sawaba did not put up candidates, calling for a boycott instead. Following the by-elections, the UCFA controlled all 60 seats.

References

Niger
1958 in Niger
Elections in Niger
Election and referendum articles with incomplete results